History: The Journal of the Historical Association is a peer-reviewed academic journal published quarterly by Wiley-Blackwell on behalf of the Historical Association. It was established in 1912 and publishes original articles, book reviews, and archive pieces in all areas of historical scholarship. The journal is abstracted and indexed by many abstracting and indexing services.

References

External links
 
 History at the HathiTrust

History journals
Wiley-Blackwell academic journals
Publications established in 1916
English-language journals
Quarterly journals
Academic journals associated with learned and professional societies